Haslen is a village, and former municipality, in the municipality of Glarus Süd and canton of Glarus in Switzerland.

History
Haslen is first mentioned in 1289 as Burchard von Hasle.

On 1 July 2006, the municipality of Haslen incorporated the neighbouring municipalities of Leuggelbach and Nidfurn. On 1 January 2011, Haslen was itself merged into the new municipality of Glarus Süd.

Geography

The villages of Leuggelbach and Diesbach lie across the river to the west, whilst Hätzingen is to the south and Schwanden is to the north.

Haslen consists of the linear village of Haslen itself, the hamlets of Leu (formerly Nesslau), Oberhaslen, Büel, Zussigen and Mülibächli.

Of this area, 42.9% is used for agricultural purposes, while 45.2% is forested. Of the rest of the land, 3.3% is settled (buildings or roads) and the remainder (8.6%) is non-productive (rivers, glaciers or mountains).

Transport
Haslen is located just off the Hauptstrasse 17, which at this point runs on the west bank of the Linth river. Hauptstrasse 17 runs the length of the canton of Glarus before climbing the Klausen Pass into the canton of Uri, as well as on the Weesen to Linthal railway line that parallels the main road and the Linth river through Glarus. The high alpine Klausen Pass is normally only open to traffic between June and September, and for the rest of the year the road and railway up the valley form the only access to the village. The village is served by Nidfurn-Haslen railway station which is served by the hourly Zürich S-Bahn service S25 between Linthal and Zurich.

Demographics
, 9.7% of the population was made up of foreign nationals. Over the last 10 years the population has decreased at a rate of -8.7%. Most of the population speaks German (90.6%), with Turkish being second most common (3.1%) and Italian being third (2.7%).

In the 2007 federal election the most popular party was the SPS which received 46.6% of the vote. Most of the rest of the votes went to the SVP with 41.8% of the vote.

The entire Swiss population is generally well educated. In Haslen about 66.6% of the population (between ages 25–64) have completed either non-mandatory upper secondary education or additional higher education (either University or a Fachhochschule).

Haslen has an unemployment rate of 0.93%. , there were 21 people employed in the primary economic sector and about 11 businesses involved in this sector. 96 people were employed in the secondary sector and there were 13 businesses in this sector. 74 people were employed in the tertiary sector, with 24 businesses in this sector.

The historical population is given in the following table:

References

External links
 
 Haslen from the Glarus Süd municipal web site (in German)
 

Former municipalities of the canton of Glarus
Villages in the canton of Glarus